Where's Marlowe? is a 1998 comedy mystery film written by Daniel Pyne and John Mankiewicz. Daniel Pyne also directed the film, which stars Miguel Ferrer, Mos Def, John Slattery, and John Livingston.

Plot
After making a three-hour fiasco about New York City's water supply, a two-man film crew decides to take it up a notch by documenting life in the private investigator offices of "Boone and Murphy". Cheating husbands and missing dogs fail to bring in the big bucks however, and after sleeping with the wife of one of their clients Murphy leaves. To stop Boone from having to close down the business the two film-makers must resort to a hands-on approach in the investigations to ensure the completion of their movie.

Cast
 Miguel Ferrer as Joe Boone
 John Livingston as A.J. Edison
 Mos Def as Wilt Crawley 
 John Slattery as Kevin Murphy
 Allison Dean as Angela
 Clayton Rohner as Sonny "Beep" Collins
 Elizabeth Schofield as Monica Collins
 Barbara Howard as Emma Huffington
 Miguel Sandoval as Skip Pfeiffer
 Bill McKinney as Uncle Bill
 Lisa Jane Persky as Jenny
 Nicki Micheaux as Caroline
 Kamala Lopez as Penny
 Wendy Benson-Landers as Heather
 Sarabeth Tucek as Rikki
 Olivia Rosewood as Stacy / Fawn
 John Hawkes as Earl
 David Newsom as Jake Pierson
 Kirk Baltz as Rivers
 Ken Jenkins as Linguist
 Wendy Crewson as Dr. Ninki Bregman
 Erich Anderson as Detective Simmons
 Alexandra Bokyun Chun as Detective Hsu
 Joyce Guy as Wilt's Mom
 Patrick Egan as A.J.'s Dad
 Connie Sawyer as Skip's Mom
 Brent Jennings as Funeral Director
 Don Keith Opper as The Composer
 Brent Roam as Angry Man
 Heather McComb as Trophy Wife
 Julia Kruis as Beautiful Woman
 Giancarlo Esposito as Blind Man (uncredited)

References

External links
 
 
 
 
 

1998 films
American comedy mystery films
1990s comedy mystery films
Films about filmmaking
Films produced by Clayton Townsend
Films scored by Michael Convertino
1990s English-language films
American independent films
1998 independent films
1990s American films